Strangler of the Swamp is a 1946 American horror film, produced and distributed by Producers Releasing Corporation.  It was written and directed by Frank Wisbar, and stars Rosemary LaPlanche, Robert Barrat and Blake Edwards.  It is a remake of Wisbar's earlier German film Fährmann Maria (1936).

Plot
A ferry operator named Douglas (Charles Middleton) was accused of a murder he did not commit and executed for the crime. Now Douglas' ghost walks the marshlands he once called home, seeking vengeance against those who wronged him. The village's new ferry operator, the beautiful Maria (Rosemary LaPlanche) must find a way to save her boyfriend Christian (Blake Edwards) from becoming the ghost's next victim.

Cast
Rosemary La Planche as Maria Hart
Robert Barrat as Christian Sanders
Blake Edwards as Christian 'Chris' Sanders Jr.
Charles Middleton as Ferryman Douglas
Effie Laird as Martina Sanders
Nolan Leary as Pete Jeffers
Frank Conlan as Joseph Hart
Therese Lyon as Bertha
Virginia Farmer as Anna Jeffers

Release

Home media
The film was released on DVD by Image Entertainment on September 21, 1999. It was later re-released by Films Around The World Inc. on January 1, 2013.

Reception

Author and film critic Leonard Maltin awarded the film two and a half out of a possible four stars, his most frequently given rating, writing "Moody, atmospheric, full of fog, it's far more cinematic that other horror films from bargain-basement PRC studio, but still suffers from a low budget as well as a lethargic pace."
Hans J. Wollstein, in his review of the film for Allmovie, gave the film a positive review, complimenting LaPlanche and Middleton's performances.

References

External links 

Strangler of the Swamp at TCMDB
Stranger of the Swamp at BFI

1946 films
1946 horror films
American supernatural horror films
American remakes of German films
American black-and-white films
Films directed by Frank Wisbar
Horror film remakes
Producers Releasing Corporation films
1940s English-language films
1940s American films